Catherine Hermary-Vieille (born 8 October 1943, 15th arrondissement of Paris) is a French writer, and winner of the Prix Femina 1981, for Le Grand Vizir de la nuit.

Work

Novels

Series Les Dames de Brières 
 2001: Les Dames de Brières, Ed. Albin Michel ; Le Livre de Poche Librairie Générale Française (LGF) 
 2001: Les Dames de Brières Tome II : L'étang du diable, Albin Michel ; (LGF) 
 2002: Les Dames de Brières Tome III : La fille du feu, Albin Michel ; (LGF)

Series Le Crépuscule des rois 
 2002: Le Crépuscule des rois Tome I : La rose d'Anjou, Albin Michel ; (LGF) 
 2003: Le Crépuscule des rois Tome II : Les reines de cœur, Albin Michel ; (LGF) 
 2004: Le Crépuscule des rois Tome III : Les lionnes d'Angleterre, Albin Michel ; (LGF)

Other novels 
 1981: Le Grand Vizir de la nuit, Gallimard ; Folio
 1983: La Marquise des ombres, Olivier Orban ; Folio
 1984: L'Épiphanie des dieux, Gallimard ; Folio
 1987: L'Infidèle, Gallimard ; Folio  
 1991: Le Jardin des Henderson, Gallimard ; Folio
 1991: Un amour fou, Olivier Orban ; Pocket
 1992: Le Rivage des adieux, Pygmalion ; (LGF) 
 1994: La Piste des turquoises, Flammarion ; (LGF)
 1995: La Pointe aux tortues, Flammarion ; (LGF) 
 1996: Lola, Plon ; Pocket
 1998: L'Initié, Plon ; Pocket 
 2003: La Bourbonnaise, Albin Michel ; (LGF) 
 2006: Lord James, Albin Michel
 2007: Le Gardien du phare, Albin Michel
 2008: Le Roman d'Alia, Albin Michel
 2009: Les Années Trianon, Albin Michel
 2011: Merveilleuses, Albin Michel
 2013: Le Siècle de Dieu, Albin Michel
 2014: , Albin Michel
 2016: D'OR et de SANG, Albin Michel

Biography 
 1986: Romy, Olivier Orban

Prizes 
 1981: Prix Femina for Le Grand Vizir de la nuit
 1984: Prix Georges Dupau awarded by the Académie Française
 1991: Prix Maison de la Presse for Un amour fou 
 Grand Prix RTL pour L'Infidèle

References 

1943 births
Living people
20th-century French women writers
20th-century French non-fiction writers
Writers from Paris
French women novelists
Prix Femina winners
Prix Maison de la Presse winners